Holy Monday or Great and Holy Monday (also Holy and Great Monday) (Greek: Μεγάλη Δευτέρα, Megale Deutera) is a day of the Holy Week, which is the week before Easter.  According to the gospels, on this day Jesus Christ cursed the fig tree, cleansed the temple, and responded to the questioning of his authority.   

It is the third day of Holy Week in Eastern Christianity, after Lazarus Saturday and Palm Sunday, and the second day of Holy Week in Western Christianity, after Palm Sunday.

Biblical narrative
The Gospels tell some of the events that occurred on the day of the Biblical Holy Monday. Some of the most notable and recognizable of these were the cursing of the fig tree, the questioning of Jesus' authority, the Cleansing of the Temple and some diverse parables, depending on which Gospel is read.

Western Christianity

In traditional Methodist usage, The Book of Worship for Church and Home (1965) provides the following Collect for Holy Monday:

Eastern Christianity

In the Eastern Orthodox Church and those Eastern Catholic Churches that follow the Byzantine Rite, this day is referred to as Great and Holy Monday, or Great Monday. On this day the Church commemorates the withering of the fruitless fig tree, a symbol of judgement that will befall those who do not bring forth the fruits of repentance. The hymns on this day also recall Joseph, the son of Jacob, whose innocent suffering at the hand of his brethren, and false accusation (-) are a type (foreshadowing) of the Passion of Christ.

The day begins liturgically with Vespers on Palm Sunday night, repeating some of the same stichera (hymns) from the Praises of the All Night Vigil the evening before. At Small Compline a Triode (Canon composed of three Odes), written by St. Andrew of Crete is chanted.

The Matins service for Monday through Wednesday of Holy Week is known as the Bridegroom Service or Bridegroom Prayer in the Greek Orthodox Church, because of their theme of Christ as the Bridegroom of the Church, a theme expressed in the troparion that is solemnly chanted near the beginning of the service. 

On these days, an icon of "Christ the Bridegroom" is placed on an analogion in the center of the temple, portraying Jesus wearing the purple robe of mockery and crowned with a crown of thorns (see Instruments of the Passion). The Matins Gospel read on this day is from the Gospel of Matthew ). The canon at Matins has only three odes in it (a triode), and was composed by St. Cosmas of Maiuma.

There are various methods of dividing the Gospels, but the most common is:
Holy and Great Monday
Third Hour—The first half of Matthew
Sixth Hour—The second half of Matthew
Ninth Hour—The first half of Mark
At the Sixth Hour there is a reading from the Book of Ezekiel 

At the Liturgy of the Presanctified Gifts, some of the stichera from the previous night's Matins (Lauds and the Aposticha) are repeated at Lord, I have cried (see Vespers).

References

External links

Great and Holy Monday Orthodox icon and synaxarion
Scriptural Reading for the Monday of Holy Week  from the Office of Readings (Roman Catholic)
Monday in Holy Week Online liturgical resources

Holy Week
Monday
April observances